Priests of the Vedic religion are officiants of the yajna service.  Yajna is an important part of Hinduism, especially the Vedas. Persons trained for the ritual and proficient in its practice were called  ( 'regularly-sacrificing').  As members of a social class, they were generically known as  'sage' or  'seer'. Specialization of roles attended the elaboration and development of the ritual corpus over time. Eventually a full complement of sixteen s became the custom for major ceremonies. The sixteen consisted of four chief priests and their assistants.

Chief priests

The older references uniformly indicate the Writtiks and Purohits then

 as the presiding priest, with perhaps only the adhvaryu as his assistant in the earliest times.  The phrase "seven hotars" is found more than once in the Rigveda.  Hymn 2.1.2 of Rigveda states it as follows,

The  was the reciter of invocations and litanies. As each phase of the ritual required an invocation, the  had a leading or presiding role.
The adhvaryu was in charge of the physical details of the sacrifice (in particular the adhvara, a term for the Somayajna). According to Monier-Williams, the adhvaryu "had to measure the ground, to build the altar, to prepare the sacrificial vessels, to fetch wood and water, to light the fire, to bring the animal and immolate it," among other duties. Each action was accompanied by supplicative or benedictive formulas (yajus), drawn from the yajurveda.
The  was a chanter of hymns set to melodies (sāman) drawn from the sāmaveda.
The  was the reciter of hymns from the  who was largely silent and observes the procedures and uses Atharvaveda mantras to 'heal' it when mistakes have been made.

The term Brahman in the above hymn 2.1.2 refers to deity Agni of hymn 2.1.1.

The rgvedic Brahmanas, Aitareya and Kausitaki, specify seven hotrakas to recite shastras (litanies): , brāhmanācchamsin, maitrāvaruna, agnīdh and acchāvāka.  They also carry a legend to explain the origin of the offices of the subrahmanya and the grāvastut.

Purohita

The requirements of the fully developed ritual were rigorous enough that only professional priests could perform them adequately. In this seconding lay the origins of the growing importance of the purohita (literally, "one who is placed in front"). In latter days, with the disappearance of Vedic ritual practice, purohita has become a generic term for "priest".

Assistants
In the systematic expositions of the shrauta sutras, which date to the fifth or sixth century BCE, the assistants are classified into four groups associated with each of the four chief priests, although the classifications are artificial and in some cases incorrect:

With the :
the maitrāvaruna
the acchāvāka
the grāvastut (praising the Soma stones)
With the :
the subrahmanya
With the adhvaryu:
the 
the 
With the brahman:
the brāhmanācchamsin
the agnīdh (priest who kindles the sacred fire)

Philological comparisons

Comparison with the sacred texts of Zoroastrianism, a distinct religion with the same origins, shows the antiquity of terms for priests such as *atharwan (Vedic atharvan; cognate to Avestan ) and *zhautar (Ved. hotar; Av. ) 'invoker, sacrificer'. While *zhautar is well understood, the original meaning of *atharwan is unknown. The word atharvan appears in the Rig Veda (e.g., in RV 6.16.13 where Agni is said to have been churned by Atharvan from the mind of every poet). In the Younger Avesta,  appears in a context that suggests "missionary," perhaps by metathesis from Indo-Iranian *arthavan "possessing purpose." However, a recent theory indicates that Proto Indo-Iranian *atharwan likely represents a substrate word from the unknown language of the BMAC civilization of Central Asia. It can be analyzed as BMAC *athar- plus the Indo-Iranian possessive suffix *-wan, in which case *atharwan would be "one who possesses *athar". Though the meaning of *athar is unknown, Pinault speculates that it meant "superior force" and connects it to the Tocharian word for "hero".

In present-day Indian Zoroastrian (Parsi) tradition the word athornan is used to distinguish the priesthood from the laity (the behdin). These subdivisions (in the historical Indian context, castes), and the terms used to describe them, are relatively recent developments specific to Indian Zoroastrians and although the words themselves are old, the meaning that they came to have for the Parsis are influenced by their centuries-long coexistence with Hinduism. It appears then that the Indian Zoroastrian priests re-adopted the older  (in preference to the traditional, and very well attested derivative āsron) for its similarity to Hinduism's , which the Parsi priests then additionally assumed was derived from Avestan ātar 'fire'. This folk-etymology may "have been prompted by what is probably a mistaken assumption of the importance of fire in the ancient Indo-Iranian religion".

The division of priestly functions among the Hotar, the Udgatar and the Adhvaryu has been compared to the Celtic priesthood as reported by Strabo, with the Druids as high priests, the Bards doing the chanting and the Vates performing the actual sacrifice.

See also
Agnihotra
Agnistoma
Brahmin
Namboothiri
Śrāddha

References

External links
 The Turning-Point in a Living Tradition

Rishis
Hindu priests
Vedic period